This is a list of Thessaloniki Metro stations. 18 stations are currently under construction, while 16 stations are planned for future extensions.

Stations under construction

Future stations
There are currently plans to extend the network to the northwest, with 8 stations, and to the southeast, with 4 stations, as well as further branches to the northwest. The named stations are:
On the northwestern loop: Eptalofos, Evosmos, Ilioupoli, Kordelio, Menemeni, Neapoli, Polihni, Stavroupoli.
On the southeast (airport) extension: Aerodromio Makedonia, Anotera Scholi Polemou, Diavalkaniko, and Georgiki Scholi.
On further branchings to the northwestern loop: Efkarpia, Nosokomio Papageorgiou, and two unnamed stations.

See also
List of Athens Metro stations
Line 1 (Thessaloniki Metro)
Line 2 (Thessaloniki Metro)
Thessaloniki Metro

References

Thessaloniki
Thessaloniki Metro